Wilmot Hyde Bradley, a.k.a. "Bill" Bradley (4 April 1899 in New Haven, CT – 12 April 1979 in Bangor, ME) was a co-founder (1943) and Chief of the Branch of Military Geology and Chief Geologist of the U.S. Geological Survey from 1944 to 1959.

He was the son of Anna Miner Hyde and John Lucius Bradley. He attended college at the Sheffield Scientific School of Yale University and graduated from Yale in 1920 with a Ph.D. in geology, after switching from engineering and chemistry.

After two years as geologic aide to Julian D. Sears of the U. S. Geological Survey, he was taken on by the Survey to work full-time on the Eocene Green River Formation because of its oil-shale potential.

As a result of his work there, the mineral "trisodium magnesium phosphate carbonate" was named Bradleyite in his honor.

On the conclusion of his 48-year career with the Geological Survey in 1970, Bill and his wife retired to Pigeon Hill Bay, Maine, where he continued writing his results from years of research on the Green River Formations and Mud Lake.

Bradley was elected to the United States National Academy of Sciences in 1946, the American Academy of Arts and Sciences in 1949, the American Philosophical Society in 1963, served as president of The Geological Society of America (GSA) in 1965 and was awarded GSA's Penrose Medal in 1972.

Bill Bradley was buried at a tiny local graveyard situated on his property at Pigeon Hill Road, Steuben, Maine. On his gravestone, he had engraved in advance the phrase, "The Earth has music for those who listen". (Although this phrase is of uncertain origin, a similar phrase -- "The Earth has its music for those who will listen"—first appeared in print in 1955 in a poem by Reginald Vincent Holmes.)

References

External links
National Academy of Sciences Biographical Memoir by E.V. McKelvey
WorldCat Identities: W. H. Bradley
National Academies Press: Photograph of Wilmot Hyde Bradley

1899 births
1979 deaths
20th-century American geologists
Presidents of the Geological Society of America
Members of the United States National Academy of Sciences

Members of the American Philosophical Society